Redwan Hussein (born 22 September 1971) is an Ethiopian politician who is serving as National Security Affairs Advisor to the Prime Minister of Ethiopia. He perviously served as Deputy Minister of foreign affairs and Ambassador of Ethiopia to Eritrea.

Early life 
Hussein received his BSC in Biology from the Addis Ababa University in 1995. Hehis  received MA in Organizational Leadership form AZUSA Pacific University in 2006. After graduating from Addis Ababa University, he taught biology at senior secondary schools including Jinka Secondary School in South Omo Zone and Awolia Secondary School in Addis Ababa. He was the head of the SNNPR Bureau of Education from 2004 to 2008.

Career 
Hussein is currently serving as Ambassador to Eritrea. Before taking up his new position, he served in various higher government positions in Federal Government and the Southern Nations, Nationalities, and Peoples' Region government. He is an executive committee member of the Ethiopian People's Revolutionary Democratic Front (since 2006) and the Southern Ethiopian People's Democratic Movement (since 2004). From 2006 to 2010 Hussein served as a Member of House of Federation representing the Silt'e people.

On 2 November 2022, Hussein was the Ethiopian central government representative present for the signing of the agreement to permanently cease hostilities with the Tigray leadership.

References

21st-century Ethiopian politicians
Living people
Mayors of Addis Ababa
1971 births
Addis Ababa University alumni
People from Southern Nations, Nationalities, and Peoples' Region
Government ministers of Ethiopia
Ambassadors of Ethiopia